Aumar Alsorani (born in Iraq) is a Canadian who was arrested in Erbil, Iraq on accusations that he was fighting in the Iraqi insurgency.

Alsorani moved to Scarborough, Ontario in the 1990s and worked as a construction labourer. On February 12, 2004, he travelled back to his native Iraq, ostensibly to visit his uncle in Sulaymaniya. The Canadian Security Intelligence Service then sent an agent to speak to his friends in Toronto, and he was arrested the following month by Kurdish officials in northern Iraq.

References

Canadian people imprisoned abroad
Iraqi emigrants to Canada
Living people
People from Scarborough, Toronto
Prisoners and detainees of Iraq
Year of birth missing (living people)